The R = T model, also known as Jackiw–Teitelboim gravity (named after Roman Jackiw and Claudio Teitelboim), is a theory of gravity with dilaton coupling in one spatial and one time dimension. It should not be confused with the CGHS model or Liouville gravity. The action is given by

The metric in this case is more amenable to analytical solutions than the general 3+1D case though a canonical reduction for the latter has recently been obtained. For example, in 1+1D, the metric for the case of two mutually interacting bodies can be solved exactly in terms of the Lambert W function, even with an additional electromagnetic field.

References 

Theory of relativity